In the 1941–42 season, USM Alger is competing in the Third Division for the 5th season French colonial era, as well as the Forconi Cup. They will be competing in Third Division, and the Coupe de la Ligue. On April 2, 1942, the board of directors announced the death of their late president, Arezki Meddad and the funeral take place at 12 p.m. meeting 22 boulvard de la Victoire.

Competitions

Overview

Third Division

League table

Group C

Matches

Coupe de la Ligue

References

External links
 L'Echo d'Alger : journal républicain du matin

USM Alger seasons
Algerian football clubs 1941–42 season